Roadkill Rising is a compilation box set release of Iggy Pop's music, released by Shout! Factory on May 17, 2011. The set contains a 4-CD set of newly remastered bootleg tracks from live Iggy Pop shows. Sequenced by decade, the set focuses on key songs by The Stooges and tracks culled from Pop’s extensive solo catalog, including his hits and an array of covers. This collection is a part of a series of “official” bootleg releases by Shout! Factory and producer David Skye, with the blessing and participation of artists to provide fans with only the best performances, highest quality recordings, superior packaging and with original cover artwork designed by illustrator William Stout, internationally renowned as one of the first rock and roll bootleg cover artists. Previous releases in the series include Emerson Lake & Palmer’s A Time and a Place and Todd Rundgren’s For Lack of Honest Work.

Track listing

Credits
Produced By: David Skye
Remastered By: Randy Wine at MoonWine Studios
Business Affairs: Dave McIntosh
Cover Illustration: William Stout
Art Direction and Package Design: Andrew Robinson
Editorial Supervision: Dorothy Stefanski
Project Assistance: Emily Sage and Jeff Palo

Notes
The album booklet credits "One for My Baby (and One More for the Road)" to Anderson/Barge/Guida/Royster. Additionally, "Real Wild Child" is erroneously credited to "Keefe" (for Johnny O'Keefe) and "Green" (for Johnny Greenan).

References

Iggy Pop albums
2011 albums
Shout! Factory compilation albums